Jovem Pan FM is a large Brazilian Radio Network, with 25 million listeners and 87 broadcasters, it is the largest FM radio network in Brazil, Latin America and the Southern Hemisphere, and is also one of the largest radio stations on the planet.

The name is derived from the word jovem, which means "young", and Pan-american. The latter comes from the name of Radio Panamerican, which began broadcasting from São Paulo on May 3, 1944 and was purchased in November of the same year by entrepreneur and sports executive Paulo Machado de Carvalho.

History
The idea to start an FM station began with Antonio Augusto Amaral de Carvalho Filho, (better known by his nickname, "Tutinha"), and began transmitting on July 1, 1976.  The name "Jovem Pan", however, was coined in 1965 by Tutinha's father, Paulo.

Tutinha's ideas were new to Brazilian FM radio. These ideas included new approaches to the DJ's delivery and the scope of music programming. They quickly  put Jovem Pan near the top of the ratings. 

In July 1994, Jovem Pan started syndicating via satellite.  The service (known as Jovem Pan SAT) was an immediate success and currently has over 87 affiliated stations.

Programs on Jovem Pan FM Sat 

  
  Pânico: Since 1993, it is currently the most famous Brazilian radio program that is displayed every day at 12:00, the success of the program is so great that in 2003 it won its TV version continuing until 2012, soon after signing with another broadcaster of radio until 2017. Currently, the program is transmitted only by radio and internet through YouTube, by the application of the radio station or also by the site of Jovem Pan, in the hourly time of 12h. The program is a leader in Brazil.
  Hit Parade Brazil: Presented every Sunday from noon to 1:00. This show presents the top 20 songs as voted on by the listeners during the past week, the Top 5 current songs (with flashbacks to previous hits), the Top 5 American and European hits, the Top of the Billboard Charts and special promotions. Between 1996 and 2000, the program was sponsored by the Bob Fernandes. Since 2001 the DJ has been Rome Jingles. In the Jovem Pan USA edition, the program is called "Hit Parade USA".
  The 7 Best: At random times, a block of seven hits will be played. This is followed by a contest called The Better 7 Winning Edition. Listeners who have registered for the contest are called by the DJ and asked to identify the names of the songs or the singers to win prizes. Occasionally, the listeners themselves are asked to call, with the first (or other randomly selected callers) eligible to compete. The feature is hosted by Telma Emerik and Sérgio Ígor.
  One after another: one hour of commercial-free music, this program is one of the most popular on this station, and is broadcast several times during the day, from Sunday to Sunday.
  In the Ballad (Na Balada): Friday, at 9:00 PM, with contributions from the local DJs.  On Saturday, the program is called Special In the Ballad, with DJs from the broadcast division of Jovem Pan, usually featuring DJ Pazinha.
  Morning on Pan: Every morning, the local announcer presents news and music, with the Best of the Week.
  Youth Connection Pan: A short, recurring feature that presents the latest celebrity gossip.
  Pan News: A short, recurring feature that presents the top stories in Brazilian and world news.
  Jurassic Pan: In two editions, one before and one after the program listed below. The show presents flashbacks to the greatest hits of the past.
  Early Morning Newspaper on Pan: From 5:00 to 6:00 in the morning, the program is presented on both FM and AM. It is also transmitted in the USA as Good Morning América, featuring a summary of world news.
  The Best Of the Week: A promotion on Sunday for Hit Parade Brazil, including spots encouraging the listeners to participate in the various prize giveaways to be offered later in the week, on the station and the website.
  Worst Moments Of Panic: Presenting the best moments of Panic, every Saturday.
  Planet DJ: A dance program featuring house, techno and other genres, every afternoon, following Panic, with a shorter version on Sunday later the Hit Parade Brazil.

References

External links
  

Brazilian radio networks
Mass media in São Paulo